The 28th Lambda Literary Awards were held on June 6, 2016, to honour works of LGBT literature published in 2015.  The list of nominees was released on March 8.

Special awards

Nominees and winners

References

Lambda Literary Awards
Lambda
Lists of LGBT-related award winners and nominees
2016 in LGBT history
Lambda